The 2015 National League was the seventh season of the National League, the third tier of British speedway. The Cradley Heathens were the defending champions after winning the competition in 2014.

Cradley finished the 2015 season in third place, as the Birmingham Brummies won the championship title. With 14 wins from 18 matches, the Brummies won the title after a 47–42 victory at the Mildenhall Fen Tigers in September, and ultimately finished 6 points clear of the Eastbourne Eagles.

Teams
The 2015 season featured 10 teams, one more than in 2014. The Scunthorpe Stags and Devon Demons did not compete in 2015, whilst the Birmingham Brummies, Eastbourne Eagles and Rye House Raiders all joined the league. National League co-ordinator Peter Morrish expressed his excitement ahead of the new season, with the addition of the Brummies and Eagles especially – two teams with extensive Elite League experience – it was expected to be one of the most exciting National League seasons in years.

Final league table

Final Leading averages

National League Knockout Cup
The 2015 National League Knockout Cup was the 18th edition of the Knockout Cup for tier three teams. Eastbourne Eagles were the winners.

First round

Quarter-finals

Semi-finals

Final

Riders & averages
Unless otherwise stated, all listed riders were declared at the start of the 2015 National League season.

Birmingham Brummies

Adam Ellis 10.14
Zach Wajtknecht 9.51
Tom Perry 8.58 
Josh Bates 8.46 
Sam Chapman 5.18

Adam Kirby 3.77
Harvie Banks 3.00
Alex Wilson 3.00
Robert Parker 3.00

Buxton Hitmen

Tony Atkin 8.18
Ben Hopwood 8.00 
Liam Carr 7.73 
Ryan Blacklock 6.84
Steve Jones 4.96 
David Speight 4.69 
Tom Woolley 4.68

Adam Extance 4.48 
David Holt 3.44 
Cameron Hoskins 3.00 
Ryan Macdonald 3.00 
Paul Bowen 3.00 
Sam Darroch 3.00 
Jack Parkinson-Blackburn 3.00

Coventry Storm

Luke Crang 8.44 
Dan Greenwood 8.29
Darryl Ritchings 7.32
Martin Knuckey 6.78
Rob Shuttleworth 6.23

Mark Baseby 5.88 
Jamie Halder 3.00
Conor Dwyer 5.44
Callum Walker 3.00

Cradley Heathens

Max Clegg 9.72
Matt Williamson 8.69
Ellis Perks 7.14
Nathan Greaves 7.08

Arron Mogridge 4.94
Michael Neale 4.85
Luke Harris 3.00
Tyler Govier 3.00

Eastbourne Eagles

Bradley Wilson-Dean 9.83
Ben Hopwood 8.00 
Marc Owen 7.25
Danny Warwick 7.01 
David Mason 6.96 
Daniel Spiller 6.63 

Georgie Wood 5.90
Richard Andrews 5.18
Matthew Bates 4.86 
Gary Cottham 4.70 
Kelsey Dugard 4.49 
Niall Strudwick 3.00

Kent Kings

Ben Morley 9.63
James Shanes 7.85
Danny Ayres 7.05
Aaron Baseby 6.37

Danno Verge 3.00
Jamie Couzins 3.00
Adam Shepherd 3.00
Ben Basford 3.00

King's Lynn Young Stars

James Cockle 8.59 
Tom Stokes 7.10
Jake Knight 6.00 
Scott Campos 5.65
Josh Bailey 6.02

Ryan Kingsley 5.13
Shane Hazelden 6.00
Layne Cupitt 3.00
Adam Portwood 3.00

Mildenhall Fen Tigers

Danny Halsey 8.24
Connor Mountain 7.07
Jack Kingston 5.84
Connor Coles 5.61
Tom Bacon 4.42

Luke Ruddick 3.30
Liam Rumsey 3.05 
Stefan Farnaby 3.00 
Nick Laurence 3.00 
Connor King 3.00

Rye House Raiders

Robert Branford 10.14
Kyle Hughes 8.67
Luke Priest 6.88 
Brendan Johnson 6.21
Luke Chessell 5.88

Alfie Bowtell 3.95
Danyon Hume 3.79 
George Hunter 3.47
Sam Woods 3.27

Stoke Potters

Lee Payne 8.00
Jon Armstrong 7.74
Danny Phillips 6.38
Chris Widman 4.73

Ryan Terry-Daley 4.72
Shaun Tedham 4.50
Paul Burnett 4.46 
Sam Ward 3.00

Development Leagues

Midland Development League

Northern Junior League

See also
List of United Kingdom Speedway League Champions
Knockout Cup (speedway)

Notes

References

Speedway National League
Speedway National League
Speedway National League